"L-Gante: Bzrp Music Sessions, Vol. 38" is a song by Argentine record producer Bizarrap and Argentine singer L-Gante. It was released on March 10, 2021 through Dale Play Records. The song has more than 80 million streams on Spotify. The song reached number 1 on the Billboard Argentina Hot 100 being the first Bzrp Music Sessions to reach the top.

Background
The session was announced by Bizarrap through a small trailer published on the producer's networks, in the video Bizarrap can be shown as a hotel worker, when he receives a letter and goes up in the elevator to the hotel rooms, in which You can show some previous Music Sessions until you reach the indicated room and the one that will open the door is L-Gante, thus confirming the Music Sessions of him.

L-Gante is an artist who is characterized by making Cumbias with a more modern sound either with trap or reggaeton, that characteristic sound is called Cumbia 420, something that lately sounds a lot in Argentina. The music video has more than 150 million views on YouTube.

Lyric
The lyrics of the song were written by L-Gante himself, many Argentines have assured that capturing the catchy rhythm of the lyrics can confuse many foreigners since their lyrics are "very Argentine" due to their use of turras or neighborhood Argentinian words.

Controversies
On March 9, 2021, a day before the session left, the singer L-Gante was arrested in San Juan, Argentina for alleged riots and breaking health regulations since he was taking photos with fans without wearing the face-masks due to the COVID-19 pandemic, he was arrested along with five other people, including a child under 15 years of age. L-Gante was able to get out of prison on bail.

Personnel
Credits adapted from Genius.

 L-Gante – vocals
 Bizarrap – producer
 Evlay – mixing
 GFX Yisus – artwork
 GianLyfe – videographer

In popular culture
The song had an appearance on the Argentine television show Bailando 2021.

Charts

Certifications

References

2021 songs
2021 singles
Bizarrap songs
Song recordings produced by Bizarrap
Argentina Hot 100 number-one singles